Bob Konovsky (August 19, 1934 – March 6, 1982) was a former guard in the National Football League. He was drafted in the seventh round of the 1956 NFL Draft by the Chicago Cardinals and played three seasons with the team. He also played for the Chicago Bears under coach and founder George Halas in 1960. Following his time in the NFL, Konovsky played with the Denver Broncos during the 1961 American Football League season. Also a wrestler, Konovsky was a 3 time Big Ten HWT Champion at The University of Wisconsin (Madison) and finished second the NCAA three times and is an inductee in the National Wrestling Hall of Fame and Museum. Bob also was a professional wrestler after college using the nickname Killer Konovsky.

References

People from Cicero, Illinois
Chicago Cardinals players
Chicago Bears players
Denver Broncos (AFL) players
American football offensive guards
Wisconsin Badgers football players
American male sport wrestlers
1934 births
Professional wrestlers from Illinois
Players of American football from Illinois
1982 deaths